Tibor Linka (born 13 February 1995) is a Slovak sprint canoer who competes in the four-man (K-4) events. He won a gold medal at the 2015 World Championships and a silver medal at the 2016 Olympics. Earlier in 2014 he was named Athlete of the Year in his native town of Šamorín. He is of Hungarian ethnicity.

Career
At the 2013 European Junior and U23 Championships he won a gold medal in K-2 500 metres junior race with Denis Myšák. Next year, again with Myšák, they finished second in the U23 race. In 2015 he became part of Slovak K-4 team, which had won many medals at the Olympic Games, World and European Championships. With Erik Vlček, Juraj Tarr and Denis Myšák, they won K-4 1000 metres race at the 2015 World Championships. In 2016, the same team won one gold  and one silver medal  at the 2016 European Championships, showing good form before the main objective of the season, the Olympic Games, where they competed in the K-4 1000 m category as the reigning World Champions and managed to win the silver medal.

References

External links

 
 
 
 

1995 births
Living people
Olympic silver medalists for Slovakia
Olympic canoeists of Slovakia
Slovak male canoeists
People from Šamorín
Sportspeople from the Trnava Region
ICF Canoe Sprint World Championships medalists in kayak
Hungarians in Slovakia
Olympic medalists in canoeing
Canoeists at the 2016 Summer Olympics
Medalists at the 2016 Summer Olympics